Agapanthia persicola is a species of beetle in the subfamily Lamiinae endemic to Iran. The flight time is from May to June, with a life cycle of one year.

References

persicola
Beetles described in 1894
Endemic fauna of Iran
Beetles of Asia